Serge Despres (born February 28, 1978) is a Canadian bobsledder from Cocagne, New Brunswick who competed from 2000 to 2006. At the 2006 Winter Olympics in Turin, he finished 11th in the two-man event and 18th in the four-man event.

References
 
 Serge Despres at the Canadian Olympic Committee
 
 2006 bobsleigh two-man results
 2006 bobsleigh four-man results

1978 births
Bobsledders at the 2006 Winter Olympics
Canadian male bobsledders
Living people
Olympic bobsledders of Canada